Ensapa Lobsang Döndrup (1505–1568) was a Tibetan Buddhist religious leader. He was posthumously recognised as the third Panchen Lama.

Ensapa was known to have spent more than 20 years meditating in isolated caves near the Himalayan mountains.
When he was a young boy Gyalwa Ensäpa received many visions of Buddha Shakyamuni. He also possessed natural clairvoyance and was able to know that people were about to visit his family even when they were still many days' journey away. Later, when he ordained as a monk, he was able to recite the entire Perfection of Wisdom Sutra in Eight Thousand Lines from memory, both in Tibetan and in Sanskrit. His fellow monks, who had never heard Sanskrit spoken, thought that he was possessed by spirits!

1505 births
1568 deaths
Panchen Lama 03
Lamas
16th-century Tibetan people
16th-century lamas